Metaphysical naturalism (also called ontological naturalism, philosophical naturalism and antisupernaturalism) is a philosophical worldview which holds that there is nothing but natural elements, principles, and relations of the kind studied by the natural sciences.  Methodological naturalism is a philosophical basis for science, for which metaphysical naturalism provides only one possible ontological foundation. Broadly, the corresponding theological perspective is religious naturalism or spiritual naturalism. More specifically, metaphysical naturalism rejects the supernatural concepts and explanations that are part of many religions.

Definition

According to Steven Schafersman, geologist and president of Texas Citizens for Science, metaphysical naturalism is a philosophy that proposes that: 1. Nature encompasses all that exists throughout space and time; 2. Nature (the universe or cosmos) consists only of natural elements, that is, of spatiotemporal physical substance—mass–energy. Non-physical or quasi-physical substance, such as information, ideas, values, logic, mathematics, intellect, and other emergent phenomena, either supervene upon the physical or can be reduced to a physical account; 3. Nature operates by the laws of physics and in principle, can be explained and understood by science and philosophy; and 4. the supernatural does not exist, i.e., only nature is real.  Naturalism is therefore a metaphysical philosophy opposed primarily by Biblical creationism.

In Carl Sagan’s words: "The Cosmos is all that is or ever was or ever will be."

According to Arthur C. Danto, naturalism, in recent usage, is a species of philosophical monism according to which whatever exists or happens is natural in the sense of being susceptible to explanation through methods which, although paradigmatically exemplified in the natural sciences, are continuous from domain to domain of objects and events. Hence, naturalism is polemically defined as repudiating the view that there exists or could exist any entities which lie, in principle, beyond the scope of scientific explanation.

Regarding the vagueness of the general term "naturalism", David Papineau traces the current usage to philosophers in early 20th century America such as John Dewey, Ernest Nagel, Sidney Hook, and Roy Wood Sellars: "So understood, 'naturalism' is not a particularly informative term as applied to contemporary philosophers. The great majority of contemporary philosophers would happily accept naturalism as just characterized—that is, they would both reject 'supernatural' entities, and allow that science is a possible route (if not necessarily the only one) to important truths about the 'human spirit'." Papineau remarks that philosophers widely regard naturalism as a "positive" term, and "few active philosophers nowadays are happy to announce themselves as 'non-naturalists'", while noting that "philosophers concerned with religion tend to be less enthusiastic about 'naturalism'" and that despite an "inevitable" divergence due to its popularity, if more narrowly construed, (to the chagrin of John McDowell, David Chalmers and Jennifer Hornsby, for example), those not so disqualified remain nonetheless content "to set the bar for 'naturalism' higher."

Philosopher and theologian Alvin Plantinga, a well-known critic of naturalism in general, comments: "Naturalism is presumably not a religion. In one very important respect, however, it resembles religion: it can be said to perform the cognitive function of a religion. There is that range of deep human questions to which a religion typically provides an answer ... Like a typical religion, naturalism gives a set of answers to these and similar questions".

Science and naturalism

Metaphysical naturalism is the philosophical basis of science as described by Kate and Vitaly (2000). "There are certain philosophical assumptions made at the base of the scientific method – namely, 1) that reality is objective and consistent, 2) that humans have the capacity to perceive reality accurately, and that 3) rational explanations exist for elements of the real world. These assumptions are the basis of naturalism, the philosophy on which science is grounded. Philosophy is at least implicitly at the core of every decision we make or position we take, it is obvious that correct philosophy is a necessity for scientific inquiry to take place." Steven Schafersman, agrees that methodological naturalism is "the adoption or assumption of philosophical naturalism within scientific method with or without fully accepting or believing it ... science is not metaphysical and does not depend on the ultimate truth of any metaphysics for its success, but methodological naturalism must be adopted as a strategy or working hypothesis for science to succeed. We may therefore be agnostic about the ultimate truth of naturalism, but must nevertheless adopt it and investigate nature as if nature is all that there is."

Various associated beliefs
Contemporary naturalists possess a wide diversity of beliefs within metaphysical naturalism.  Most metaphysical naturalists have adopted some form of materialism or physicalism.

Natural sciences

According to metaphysical naturalism, if nature is all there is, just as natural cosmological processes, e.g. quantum fluctuations from a multiverse, led to the Big Bang, and stellar nucleosynthesis brought upon the earliest chemical elements throughout stellar evolution, the formation of the Solar System and the processes involved in abiogenesis arose from natural causes. Naturalists reason about how, not if evolution happened.  They maintain that humanity's existence is not by intelligent design but rather a natural process of emergence. With the protoplanetary disk creating planetary bodies, including the Sun and moon, conditions for life to arise billions of years ago, along with the natural formation of plate tectonics, the atmosphere, land masses, and the origin of oceans would also contribute to the kickstarting of biological evolution to occur after the arrival of the earliest organisms, as evidenced throughout both the fossil record and the geological time scale.

The mind is a natural phenomenon

Metaphysical naturalists do not believe in a soul or spirit, nor in ghosts, and when explaining what constitutes the mind they rarely appeal to substance dualism. If one's mind, or rather one's identity and existence as a person, is entirely the product of natural processes, three conclusions follow according to W. T. Stace. Cognitive sciences are able to provide accounts of how cultural and psychological phenomena, such as religion, morality, language, and more, evolved through natural processes. Consciousness itself would also be susceptible to the same evolutionary principles that select other traits.

Utility of intelligence and reason
Metaphysical naturalists hold that intelligence is the refinement and improvement of naturally evolved faculties. The certitude of deductive logic remains unexplained by this essentially probabilistic view. Nevertheless, naturalists believe anyone who wishes to have more beliefs that are true than are false should seek to perfect and consistently employ their reason in testing and forming beliefs. Empirical methods (especially those of proven use in the sciences) are unsurpassed for discovering the facts of reality, while methods of pure reason alone can securely discover logical errors.

View on the soul

According to metaphysical naturalism, immateriality being unprocedural and unembodiable, isn't differentiable from nothingness. The immaterial nothingness of the soul, being a non-ontic state, isn't compartmentalizable nor attributable to different persons and different memories, it is non-operational and it (nothingness) cannot be manifested in different states in order it represents information.

History

Ancient and medieval philosophy
Naturalism was the foundation of two (Vaisheshika, Nyaya) of the six orthodox schools and one (Carvaka) heterodox school of Hinduism. The Carvaka, Nyaya, Vaisheshika schools originated in the 7th, 6th, and 2nd century BCE, respectively.

Western metaphysical naturalism originated in ancient Greek philosophy. The earliest pre-Socratic philosophers, especially the Milesians (Thales, Anaximander, and Anaximenes) and the atomists (Leucippus and Democritus), were labeled by their peers and successors "the physikoi" (from the Greek φυσικός or physikos, meaning "natural philosopher", borrowing on the word φύσις or physis, meaning "nature") because they investigated natural causes, often excluding any role for gods in the creation or operation of the world. This eventually led to fully developed systems such as Epicureanism, which sought to explain everything that exists as the product of atoms falling and swerving in a void.

Aristotle surveyed the thought of his predecessors and conceived of nature in a way that charted a middle course between their excesses.

With the rise and dominance of Christianity in the West and the later spread of Islam, metaphysical naturalism was generally abandoned by intellectuals. Thus, there is little evidence for it in medieval philosophy. The reintroduction of Aristotle's empirical epistemology as well as previously lost treatises by Greco-Roman natural philosophers which was begun by the medieval Scholastics without resulting in any noticeable increase in commitment to naturalism.

Modern philosophy
It was not until the early modern era of philosophy and the Age of Enlightenment that naturalists like Benedict Spinoza (who put forward a theory of psychophysical parallelism), David Hume, and the proponents of French materialism (notably Denis Diderot, Julien La Mettrie, and Baron d'Holbach) started to emerge again in the 17th and 18th centuries. In this period, some metaphysical naturalists adhered to a distinct doctrine, materialism, which became the dominant category of metaphysical naturalism widely defended until the end of the 19th century.

Immanuel Kant rejected (reductionist) materialist positions in metaphysics, but he was not hostile to naturalism. His transcendental philosophy is considered to be a form of liberal naturalism.

In late modern philosophy, Naturphilosophie, a form of natural philosophy, was developed by Friedrich Wilhelm Joseph von Schelling and Georg Wilhelm Friedrich Hegel as an attempt to comprehend nature in its totality and to outline its general theoretical structure.

A version of naturalism that arose after Hegel was Ludwig Feuerbach's anthropological materialism, which influenced Karl Marx and Friedrich Engels's historical materialism, Engels's "materialist dialectic" philosophy of nature (Dialectics of Nature), and their follower Georgi Plekhanov's dialectical materialism.

Another notable school of late modern philosophy advocating naturalism was German materialism: members included Ludwig Büchner, Jacob Moleschott, and Carl Vogt.

Contemporary philosophy
In the early 20th century, matter was found to be a form of energy and therefore not fundamental as materialists had assumed. (See History of physics.) In contemporary analytic philosophy, renewed attention to the problem of universals, philosophy of mathematics, the development of mathematical logic, and the post-positivist revival of metaphysics and the philosophy of religion, initially by way of Wittgensteinian linguistic philosophy, further called the naturalistic paradigm into question. Developments such as these, along with those within science and the philosophy of science brought new advancements and revisions of naturalistic doctrines by naturalistic philosophers into metaphysics, ethics, the philosophy of language, the philosophy of mind, epistemology, etc., the products of which include physicalism and eliminative materialism, supervenience, causal theories of reference, anomalous monism, naturalized epistemology (e.g. reliabilism), internalism and externalism, ethical naturalism, and property dualism, for example.

A politicized version of naturalism that has arisen in contemporary philosophy is Ayn Rand's Objectivism. Objectivism is an expression of capitalist ethical idealism within a naturalistic framework. In ethics, secular humanists also largely endorse the stance of metaphysical naturalism.

The current usage of the term naturalism "derives from debates in America in the first half of the last century. The self-proclaimed 'naturalists' from that period included John Dewey, Ernest Nagel, Sidney Hook and Roy Wood Sellars."

Currently, metaphysical naturalism is more widely embraced than in previous centuries, especially but not exclusively in the natural sciences and the Anglo-American, analytic philosophical communities. While the vast majority of the population of the world remains firmly committed to non-naturalistic worldviews, prominent contemporary defenders of naturalism and/or naturalistic theses and doctrines today include J. J. C. Smart, David Malet Armstrong, David Papineau, Paul Kurtz, Brian Leiter, Daniel Dennett, Michael Devitt, Fred Dretske, Paul and Patricia Churchland, Mario Bunge, Jonathan Schaffer, Hilary Kornblith, Quentin Smith, Paul Draper and Michael Martin, among many other academic philosophers.

According to David Papineau, contemporary naturalism is a consequence of the build-up of scientific evidence during the twentieth century for the "causal closure of the physical", the doctrine that all physical effects can be accounted for by physical causes.

According to Steven Schafersman, president of Texas Citizens for Science, an advocacy group opposing creationism in public schools, the progressive adoption of methodological naturalism—and later of metaphysical naturalism—followed the advances of science and the increase of its explanatory power. These advances also caused the diffusion of positions associated with metaphysical naturalism, such as existentialism.

In contemporary continental philosophy, Quentin Meillassoux proposed speculative materialism, a post-Kantian return to David Hume which can strengthen classical materialist ideas.

Arguments for metaphysical naturalism

Argument from physical minds

In the context of creation and evolution debates, Internet Infidels co-founder Jeffery Jay Lowder argues against what he calls "the argument from bias", that a priori, the supernatural is merely ruled out due to an unexamined stipulation. Lowder believes "there are good empirical reasons for believing that metaphysical naturalism is true, and therefore a denial of the supernatural need not be based upon an a priori assumption".

Several metaphysical naturalists have used the trends in scientific discoveries about minds to argue that no supernatural minds exist.  Jeffery Jay Lowder says, "Since all known mental activity has a physical basis, there are probably no disembodied minds. But God is conceived of as a disembodied mind. Therefore, God probably does not exist." Lowder argues the correlation between mind and brain implies that supernatural souls do not exist because the theist position, according to Lowder, is that the mind depends upon this soul instead of the brain.

Argument from cognitive biases

In contrast with the argument from reason or evolutionary argument against naturalism, it can be argued that cognitive biases are better explained by natural causes than as the work of God.

Arguments against

Arguments against metaphysical naturalism include the following examples.

Argument from reason

Philosophers and theologians such as Victor Reppert, William Hasker, and Alvin Plantinga have developed an argument for dualism dubbed the "argument from reason". They credit C.S. Lewis with first bringing the argument to light in his book Miracles; Lewis called the argument "The Cardinal Difficulty of Naturalism", which was the title of chapter three of Miracles.

The argument postulates that if, as naturalism entails, all of our thoughts are the effect of a physical cause, then we have no reason for assuming that they are also the consequent of a reasonable ground. However, knowledge is apprehended by reasoning from ground to consequent. Therefore, if naturalism were true, there would be no way of knowing it (or anything else), except by a fluke.

Through this logic, the statement "I have reason to believe naturalism is valid" is inconsistent in the same manner as "I never tell the truth." That is, to conclude its truth would eliminate the grounds from which it reaches it. To summarize the argument in the book, Lewis quotes J. B. S. Haldane, who appeals to a similar line of reasoning:

In his essay "Is Theology Poetry?", Lewis himself summarises the argument in a similar fashion when he writes:

But Lewis later agreed with Elizabeth Anscombe's response to his Miracles argument. She showed that an argument could be valid and ground-consequent even if its propositions were generated via physical cause and effect by non-rational factors. Similar to Anscombe, Richard Carrier and John Beversluis have written extensive objections to the argument from reason on the untenability of its first postulate.

Evolutionary argument against naturalism

Notre Dame philosophy of religion professor and Christian apologist Alvin Plantinga argues, in his evolutionary argument against naturalism, that the probability that evolution has produced humans with reliable true beliefs, is low or inscrutable, unless their evolution was guided, for example, by God.  According to David Kahan of the University of Glasgow, in order to understand how beliefs are warranted, a justification must be found in the context of supernatural theism, as in Plantinga's epistemology. (See also Supernormal stimuli.)

Plantinga argues that together, naturalism and evolution provide an insurmountable "defeater for the belief that our cognitive faculties are reliable", i.e., a skeptical argument along the lines of Descartes' evil demon or brain in a vat.

Branden Fitelson of the University of California, Berkeley and Elliott Sober of the University of Wisconsin–Madison argue that Plantinga must show that the combination of evolution and naturalism also defeats the more modest claim that "at least a non-negligible minority of our beliefs are true", and that defects such as cognitive bias are nonetheless consistent with being made in the image of a rational God. Whereas evolutionary science already acknowledges that cognitive processes are unreliable, including the fallibility of the scientific enterprise itself, Plantinga's hyperbolic doubt is no more a defeater for naturalism than it is for theistic metaphysics founded upon a non-deceiving God who designed the human mind: "[neither] can construct a non-question-begging argument that refutes global skepticism." Plantinga's argument has also been criticized by philosopher Daniel Dennett and independent scholar Richard Carrier who argue that a cognitive apparatus for truth-finding can result from natural selection.

See also

 Atheism
 Daoism
 Dysteleology
 Ethical naturalism
 Hylomorphism
 Liberal naturalism
 Natural Supernaturalism
 Naturalist computationalism
 Naturalistic fallacy
 Naturalistic pantheism
 Platonized naturalism
 Poetic naturalism
 Reductive materialism
 Religious naturalism
 Revisionary materialism
 School of Naturalists
 Scientism
 Scientistic materialism
 Spiritual naturalism
 Supernaturalism
 Transcendental naturalism

Notes

References
Books

 
 

 
 
Veli-Matti Karkkainen. (2015). Creation and Humanity: A Constructive Christian Theology for the Pluralistic World, Volume 3. Pg 36. William B. Eerdmans Publishing Company. ISBN 978-0802868558.

Journals
 
Web

Further reading

Historical overview

 Edward B. Davis and Robin Collins, "Scientific Naturalism". In Science and Religion: A Historical Introduction, ed. Gary B. Ferngren, Johns Hopkins University Press, 2002, pp. 322–34.

Pro
Gary Drescher, Good and Real, The MIT Press, 2006. 
David Malet Armstrong, A World of States of Affairs, Cambridge: Cambridge University Press, 1997. 
Mario Bunge, 2006, Chasing Reality: Strife over Realism, University of Toronto Press.  and 2001, Scientific Realism: Selected Essays of Mario Bunge, Prometheus Books. 
Richard Carrier, 2005, Sense and Goodness without God: A Defense of Metaphysical Naturalism, AuthorHouse. 
Mario De Caro & David Macarthur (eds), 2004. Naturalism in Question. Cambridge, Mass: Harvard University Press. 
Daniel Dennett, 2003, Freedom Evolves, Penguin.  and 2006
Andrew Melnyk, 2003, A Physicalist Manifesto: Thoroughly Modern Materialism, Cambridge University Press. 
Jeffrey Poland, 1994, Physicalism: The Philosophical Foundations, Oxford University Press.

Con
James Beilby, ed., 2002, Naturalism Defeated? Essays on Plantinga's Evolutionary Argument Against Naturalism, Cornell University Press. 
William Lane Craig and J.P. Moreland, eds., 2000, Naturalism: A Critical Analysis, Routledge. 
Stewart Goetz and Charles Taliaferro, 2008, Naturalism, Eerdmans Publishing. 
Phillip E. Johnson, 1998, Reason in the Balance: The Case Against Naturalism in Science, Law & Education, InterVarsity Press.  and 2002, The Wedge of Truth: Splitting the Foundations of Naturalism, InterVarsity Press. 
C.S. Lewis, ed., 1996, "Miracles", Harper Collins. 
Michael Rea, 2004, World without Design: The Ontological Consequences of Naturalism, Oxford University Press. 
Victor Reppert, 2003, C.S. Lewis's Dangerous Idea: In Defense of the Argument from Reason, InterVarsity Press. 
Mark Steiner, 2002, The Applicability of Mathematics as a Philosophical Problem, Harvard University Press.

External links
 "Naturalism" in the Internet Encyclopedia of Philosophy
 "Naturalism" in the Stanford Encyclopedia of Philosophy
 "Naturalism in Legal Philosophy" in the Stanford Encyclopedia of Philosophy
 "Naturalism in the Philosophy of Mathematics" in the Stanford Encyclopedia of Philosophy
 "Physicalism" in the Stanford Encyclopedia of Philosophy
 "Naturalism" in the Catholic Encyclopedia
 Center for Naturalism
 Naturalism entry in The Skeptic's Dictionary
 Naturalism Library at the Secular Web
 Naturalism as a Worldview resource page by Richard Carrier
 A Defense of Naturalism by Keith Augustine (2001)

Epistemological theories
Epistemology of religion
Epistemology of science
Metaphysical theories
Naturalism (philosophy)